Holytown railway station is a railway station serving both Holytown and New Stevenston in North Lanarkshire, Scotland. It was opened in 1880 (as 'Carfin') at the same time as the Wishaw Deviation Line from Law Junction, though the line on which it actually stands (the Wishaw and Coltness Railway) is considerably older.

The station was opened to assist the coal mining industry; the mines are now long gone.

This created a twice-hourly service at Holytown to/from Glasgow and a regular link to/from Motherwell.

Services

2008 onward 
Monday to Saturdays on the Shotts Line there is an hourly service westbound to Glasgow via  and eastbound to Edinburgh.

On the Argyle Line there is an hourly service northbound to Glasgow Central and beyond (to ) and southbound to Lanark via  with no Sunday service.

December 2014 

Following a recast of the Argyle Line timetable in the wake of the Whifflet Line electrification, there is no longer a regular daytime service to Motherwell, Milngavie via Anderston or Lanark. Only the hourly (two-hourly Sunday) Shotts line stopping services now call here - one of these in each direction (06:00 Motherwell to Edinburgh Waverley ) now provides the statutory minimum service from Motherwell over the Mossend South Jcn to East Jcn curve.

References

Sources 

 
 RAILSCOT on Caledonian Railway
 RAILSCOT on Cleland and Midcalder Line

Railway stations in North Lanarkshire
Railway stations served by ScotRail
SPT railway stations
Former Caledonian Railway stations
Railway stations in Great Britain opened in 1880